The fourth season of the animated television series Johnny Test premiered on September 10, 2009, containing 26 full episodes. It was the first season to premiere on Teletoon first. This is the first season to be produced in high definition. This season began airing on Cartoon Network on November 9, 2009. This would be the final season for Louis Chirillo and Ashleigh Ball as the voices of Dukey, Mary Test, and Sissy Blakely, although Ball returns later to resume her roles in Season 6. According to the credits, Warner Bros. still owns its trademark.

This season, along with the third season, was released on DVD in a bundle on September 13, 2011 in Region 1.

Cast
 James Arnold Taylor as Johnny Test
 Louis Chirillo as Dukey
 Ashleigh Ball as Mary Test
 Maryke Hendrikse as Susan Test

Episodes

While the first 22 episodes were directed by Paul Riley, "Johnny's Royal Flush / Johnny Test's Day Off", "Johnny and Dark Vegan's Battle Brawl Mania / A Scholarship for Johnny" and "Johnny Boat Racing / Johnny Lock Down" were directed by Larry Jacobs and the final episode "Good Ol' Johnny Test / Johnny X Strikes Back Again!" was directed by John Lei.

Notes

References

2009 American television seasons
2010 American television seasons
2011 American television seasons
Johnny Test seasons
2009 Canadian television seasons
2010 Canadian television seasons
2011 Canadian television seasons